Erlend Ernst Blakstad Sivertsen (born 28 January 1991) is a Norwegian professional footballer who plays for Östersund, as a defender.

Career
He signed for Östersund in January 2022.

Career statistics

References

1991 births
Living people
Norwegian footballers
Kristiansund BK players
Norwegian First Division players
Eliteserien players
Association football defenders
Tromsø IL players
Östersunds FK players
Norwegian expatriate footballers
Norwegian expatriates in Sweden
Expatriate footballers in Sweden